Glipidiomorpha curticauda is a species of beetle in the genus Glipidiomorpha of the family Mordellidae. It was described in 1968 by Ermisch.

References

Beetles described in 1968
Mordellidae